Christine Patricia Allen Armiño is a Mexican astronomer whose research has included runaway stars including the Becklin–Neugebauer Object, the overall distribution of mass in the Milky Way and its effects on stellar orbits, binary and multiple star systems, and the applications of binary star observations in testing physical theories. She is a senior researcher at the Institute of Astronomy of the National Autonomous University of Mexico, and the editor of the Mexican Magazine of Astronomy and Astrophysics.

The galactic mass distribution model she developed with Alfredo Santillán has been called the Allen–Santillán model.

Recognition
Allen is a member of the Mexican Academy of Sciences. UNAM gave her their Sor Juana Inés de la Cruz prize in 2008.

Selected publications

References

Year of birth missing (living people)
Living people
Members of the Mexican Academy of Sciences
Mexican astronomers
Women astronomers
21st-century astronomers
21st-century Mexican scientists
21st-century women scientists
Academic staff of the National Autonomous University of Mexico